Barbu is a former municipality in the old Aust-Agder county in Norway. Today, it is part of the is part of the town of Arendal in Agder county. The  municipality existed from 1878 until 1902 when it was merged into the town of Arendal. The municipality was located just to the north of what was then the  town of Arendal. The administrative centre of the small, urban municipality was called Barbu as well. Barbu Church was the church for the municipality.

Today, the name Barbu refers to the village-like place located in head of the Galtesundet strait within the town of Arendal. Barbu is also a parish in the Arendal prosti (deanery) within the Diocese of Agder og Telemark.

History
Originally, Barbu was a part of the municipality of Østre Moland that was created on 1 January 1838 (see formannskapsdistrikt law). On 1 May 1878, Østre Moland was divided to form three municipalities: Barbu (population: 4,874), Østre Moland (population: 2,524), and Tromøy (population: 2,320). On 1 January 1902, Barbu was merged with the neighboring town of Arendal, vastly increasing the size of the town. Before the merger, Barbu had a population of 6,787.

Name

See also
List of former municipalities of Norway

References

External links

Arendal
Former municipalities of Norway
1878 establishments in Norway
1902 disestablishments in Norway